Anastasia Slonova may refer to:

 Anastassiya Slonova (born 1991), Kazakhstani cross-country skier
 Anastasia Slonova (footballer) (born 1984), Moldovan football forward